Mary Sheehy Moe is a Democratic member of the Montana Legislature. A former schoolteacher, she was first elected to Senate District 12 on November 4, 2014, with 53.7% of the vote. Moe was sworn in on January 3, 2015, and represents part of Great Falls, Montana. She resigned her seat in January 2017 to spend more time with her daughter, who had recently given birth to triplets. She was replaced by Democrat Carlie Boland.

Awards 
 2018 MEA-MFT Hall of Fame inductee.

References

Living people
Democratic Party Montana state senators
21st-century American politicians
Year of birth missing (living people)
People from Great Falls, Montana